Bárður J. Hansen (born 13 March 1992) is a Faroese footballer.

Career

Club career
Bárður Jógvanson Hansen got his debut for Víkingur in the Faroese Premier League in 2008 as a 16-year-old. He won the Faroese Cup with Víkingur in 2009 and played in both matches against Turkish Beşiktaş in the Europa League second qualifying round in 2010.

International career
Hansen made his international debut against Greece on 13 June 2015, in a 2–1 win.

References

External links
Profile on Víkingur Gøta's Official Website
Profile on Faroesoccer.com
Profile on UEFA.com

Faroese footballers
Faroe Islands international footballers
Víkingur Gøta players
1992 births
Living people
People from Tórshavn
Association football defenders
Fremad Amager players
Faroe Islands youth international footballers